Edon High School is a public high school in Edon, Ohio.  It is the only high school in the Edon Northwest Local Schools district.  Their nickname is the Bombers, which was chosen after being suggested in a naming contest by Charles Brigle (class of 1938) while a freshman at EHS.  They are primarily members of the Buckeye Border Conference, but compete in the Toledo Area Athletic Conference for football.

References

External links
 District Website

High schools in Williams County, Ohio
Public high schools in Ohio